There have been 48 modern Paralympians who have identified as lesbian, gay, bisexual, transgender, pansexual, non-binary, queer, or who have openly been in a same-sex relationship, including two who also competed at the Olympic Games. The first Paralympic Games in which an athlete now known to be LGBT+ competed was the 1992 Summer Paralympics.

The most decorated LGBT+ Olympian is British Paralympic equestrian Lee Pearson, with 17 medals including 14 golds. At least 31 LGBT+ Paralympians are medalists (64.58% of LGBT+ Paralympians), of which 15 have at least one gold medal (31.25%).

Overview

Key 

Tables are default sorted by first Games appearance chronologically, then current surname or common nickname alphabetically, then first name alphabetically. They can be sorted by current surname (where used) or common nickname alphabetically; by country and sport alphabetically; by Games chronologically; and by medals as organised in Olympics medals tables.

Paralympic athletes

Notes

References

Sources 

Paralympians
LGBT Paralympians
LGBT Paralympians